The civic mayor of Doncaster is the ceremonial leader of the Metropolitan Borough of Doncaster. The civic mayor is appointed annually from the members of Doncaster Metropolitan Borough Council and serves for one municipal year.

History
The first mayor of Doncaster, in 1493, was a Thomas Pigborne. The first mayor of the Borough of Doncaster under the Municipal Corporations Act 1835 was Sir William Bryan Cooke, 8th baronet of Wheatley. The role was reconstituted on 1 April 1974 to cover the larger Metropolitan Borough of Doncaster. On 18 May 2018 history was made when Councillor Majid Khan became the first ethnic minority Mayor of Doncaster.

Since May 2002 there has also been a directly elected mayor of Doncaster and in May 2012, voters decided in a referendum to keep the position.

List of civic mayors (since 1900) 
Source: Doncaster History

 1900 Charles Theobald
 1901 Thomas Windle
 1902 Robert Robinson
 1903 John Tinsley Spencer
 1904 George Smith
 1905 George Smith
 1906 Nathan Gyles
 1907 Enoch Ellis
 1908 Joseph Firth Clark
 1909 George Bennett
 1910 John Halmshaw
 1911 Charles Wightman
 1912 William Clark
 1913 John Thomas Kay
 1914 Patrick Stirling (engineer/footballer)
 1915 Samuel Balmforth
 1916 Samuel Balmforth
 1917 George Raithby
 1918 Abner Carr
 1919 Richard Martin Jackson
 1920 Frederick William Cocking
 1921 Samuel Morris
 1922 George Thomas Tuby
 1923 Thomas Hedley Oliver
 1924 William Davy Borrill
 1925 Edwin Smith Knight
 1926 Ernest John Dowson

County Borough 

 1927 Herbert Myers Marshall
 1928 Harry Warren
 1929 Richard Henry Hepworth
 1930 Walter James Crookes
 1931 George Watson
 1932 Arthur Thomson
 1933 Thomas Gilberthorpe
 1934 George Herbert Ranyard
 1935 Harry Herbert Bone 
 1936 Thomas Henry Johnson
 1937 Samuel Morris
 1938 Willie Corbett
 1939 Herbert Fred Heaviside
 1940 Ernest Scargall
 1940 Andrew Clarke
 1941 Frederick Charles Trotter
 1942 Charles Herbert Mason
 1943 Sidney Howe Auckland
 1944 Walter Firth
 1945 Frederick Charles Trotter
 1946 Ernest Shaw
 1947 Harry Llewellyn Goe
 1948 Percy Judd
 1949 Herbert Martin
 1949 Percy Judd
 1950 Herbert Wilson
 1951 Rose Hodson
 1952 Edgar Hubbard
 1953 Albert Edward Cammidge
 1954 Herbert Jackson
 1955 Alfred Edward Hall
 1956 Elizabeth Dougal Callander
 1957 William Chappell
 1958 Arthur Harvey
 1959 Fred Ogden
 1960 Frank Stafford Heptonstall
 1961 Thomas Henry Wright
 1962 Reginald Kelsall
 1963 William Ernest Whittington
 1964 Stanley Claude Holbrook
 1965 H. Culshaw
 1966 George Francis Hardy
 1967 Elsie Stenson
 1968 William Hubert Kelly
 1969 Marcus S. Outwin
 1970 Olive Sunderland
 1971 William Clarke
 1972 Edith Plumb
 1973 Arthur Heaven

Metropolitan Borough

1974 - 1975 Albert Edward Cammidge
1975 - 1976 Gerald Messines McDade
1976 - 1977 Gordon Gallimore
1977 - 1978 Robert Vernon Carr Grainger
1978 - 1979 Winifred M. Liversidge 
1979 - 1980 George Cheshire
1980 - 1981 John Edward Oliver
1981 - 1982 Alexander Grimson
1982 - 1983 Harry Schofield
1983 - 1984 Catherine Bower
1984 - 1985 Norma Wilson
1985 - 1986 Lionel Norten Hall
1986 - 1987 Edward Gardner
1987 - 1988 Gladys Ambler
1988 - 1989 Ronald Wilfred Gillies
1989 - 1990 Raymond Stockhill
1990 - 1991 John Meredith
1991 - 1992 William R. Gillies
1992 - 1993 Charles W. Verrill
1993 - 1994 John Quinn
1994 - 1995 Gordon Gallimore
1995 - 1996 Andy Lanaghan
1996 - 1997 Dorothy Layton
1997 - 1998 Sheila Mitchinson
1998 - 1999 Margaret Robinson
1999 - 2000 Yvonne Woodcock
2000 - 2001 Maureen Edgar
2001 - 2002 Beryl Roberts
2002 - 2003 John R. Quinn
2003 - 2004 G. M. (Mick) Jameson 
2004 - 2005 Margaret Ward 
2005 - 2006 Susan Bolton 
2006 - 2007 Norah Troops 
2007 - 2008 Anthony Sockett 
2008 - 2009 Paul Coddington 
2009 - 2010 Ros Jones   
2010 Margaret Pinkney (resigned due to ill health)
2010 - 2011 Ken Knight 
2011 - 2012 Eva Hughes 
2012 - 2013 Christine Mills 
2013 - 2014 Eddie Dobbs  
2014 - 2015 Pat Haith
2015 - 2016 Paul Wray
2016 - 2017 David Nevett
2017 - 2018 Leslie George Derx
2018 - 2019 Majid Khan
2019 - 2021 Linda Curran
2020 - 2021
2021 - Richard Allan Jones

References

Doncaster
 
South Yorkshire-related lists